Rabyně is a municipality and village in Benešov District in the Central Bohemian Region of the Czech Republic. It has about 300 inhabitants. It lies on the shore of the Slapy Reservoir.

Administrative parts
Villages of Blaženice, Loutí, Měřín and Nedvězí are administrative parts of Rabyně.

References

Villages in Benešov District